Uranius Mons, formerly Uranius Patera, is a volcano on Mars located in the Tharsis quadrangle, named after a classical albedo feature. The name "Uranius Patera" now refers only to the volcano's central caldera. It belongs to the Uranius group of volcanoes in the Tharsis area. The sides of Uranius Mons consist of radial lava flows; the large caldera (90×65 km) is elongated in the southwestern direction. The surrounding plains are younger and part of the Tharsis  Montes Formation of the Amazonian epoch.

References 

Tharsis quadrangle
Volcanoes of Mars